Zinc finger and BTB domain-containing protein 16 is a protein that in humans is encoded by the ZBTB16 gene.

Function 

This gene is a member of the Krueppel C2H2-type zinc-finger protein family and encodes a zinc finger transcription factor that contains nine Kruppel-type zinc finger domains at the carboxyl terminus. This protein is located in the nucleus, is involved in cell cycle progression, and interacts with a histone deacetylase. Specific instances of aberrant gene rearrangement at this locus have been associated with acute promyelocytic leukemia (APL) and physiological roles have been identified in mouse Natural Killer T cells and gamma-delta T cells. Alternate transcriptional splice variants have been characterized in human.

Interactions 

Zinc finger and BTB domain-containing protein 16 has been shown to interact with:

 Angiotensin II receptor type 1, 
 BCL6, 
 BMI1, 
 Calcitriol receptor,
 FHL2, 
 GATA1, 
 GATA2, 
 HDAC1, 
 HDAC4, 
 HDAC5, 
 HDAC6, 
 Heparin-binding EGF-like growth factor, 
 Nuclear receptor co-repressor 2, 
 Promyelocytic leukemia protein 
 RUNX1T1, 
 Retinoic acid receptor alpha, 
 SIN3A, 
 SIN3B,  and
 ZBTB32.

See also 
 Zbtb7

References

Further reading

External links 
 

Transcription factors